Manuel Peña may refer to:

Politics
Juan Manuel de la Peña Bonifaz (died 1669), Spanish politician in the Philippines
Manuel de la Peña y Peña (1780-1850), Mexican politician
Manuel la Peña (fl 1808-1811), Spanish military officer
Manuel Arturo Peña Batlle (1902-1954), Dominican politician

Sports
Manolo Peña (1965-2012), Spanish professional footballer

Juan Manuel Peña (born 1973), Bolivian professional footballer
Manuel Pena Garces (born 1983), Spanish Basketball Coach 
Manuel Peña López (born 1998), Argentine tennis player